French football club SC Bastia's 2003–04 season. Finished 17th place in league. Top scorer of the season, including 9 goals in 8 league matches have been Florian Maurice. Was eliminated to Coupe de France end of 64, the Coupe de la Ligue was able to be among the final 16 teams.

Transfers

In 
Summer
 Youssouf Hadji from Nancy
 Frédéric Née from Lyon
 Niša Saveljić from Sochaux
 Benoît Cauet from Calcio Como 1907
 Alou Diarra from Le Havre
 Angelo Hugues from Wisła Kraków
 Pascal Chimbonda from Le Havre

Winter
 Bartholomew Ogbeche from Paris SG
 Philippe Delaye from Rennes
 Vitorino Hilton from Servette

Out 
Summer
 Hassan Ahamada to Nantes
 Philippe Billy to Lecce
 Grégory Vignal to Liverpool
 Ali Boumnijel to Rouen
 Samir Beloufa to Royal Mouscron-Péruwelz
 Nicolas Alnoudji to Sedan
 Michael Essien to Lyon
 Lilian Laslandes to Nice
 Franck Silvestre to Sturm Graz

Winter
 Niša Saveljić to Guingamp
 Laurent Batlles to Marseille
 Demetrius Ferreira to Marseille

Ligue 1

League table

Results summary

Results by round

Matches

Coupe de France

Coupe de la Ligue

Statistics

Top scorers

League top assists

References 

SC Bastia seasons
Bastia